Ping An Bank Co., Ltd. is a Chinese joint-stock commercial bank with its headquarters in Shenzhen. It primarily operates in Mainland China with a representative branch in Hong Kong. The bank offers services in retail and corporate banking, including investment banking services. As a subsidiary of Ping An Insurance, the bank is one of the three main pillars of Ping An Group: insurance, banking and asset management.

The bank reverse takeover publicly traded company Shenzhen Development Bank and retained the stock code of the bank in 2012.

As one of twelve joint-stock commercial banks in China, Ping An Bank is a component of the FTSE China A50 Index, Hang Seng China 50 Index, and CSI 300 Index amongst others.

Honors

Ping An Bank was awarded the Business Model of the Year for 2019 at The Asian Banker International Excellence in Retail Financial Awards 2019. 

Ping An Bank is China's first bank to receive the "Asia's Best Digital Bank" award in 2020. 

Ping An Bank Wins Gartner Innovation Award for Financial Services in 2020.

References

External links

 

Ping An Insurance
Companies listed on the Shenzhen Stock Exchange
Companies in the CSI 100 Index
Banks of China
Companies based in Shenzhen
Banks established in 1995
Chinese brands
Civilian-run enterprises of China